Hon. Robert Preston Bruce DL (4 December 1851 – 8 December 1893) was a British Liberal Party politician.

Bruce was the second son of James Bruce, 8th Earl of Elgin and his second wife, Lady Mary Louisa Lambton, daughter of the 1st Earl of Durham. He was educated at Eton College and Balliol College, Oxford. He was a captain in the Fifeshire Artillery Militia from 1877 to 1881 and was a J.P. and deputy lieutenant for Fifeshire.

Bruce was elected at the 1880 general election as the Member of Parliament (MP) for Fife. When the seat was divided under the Redistribution of Seats Act 1885 he stood and was elected unopposed for the new Western division of Fife. He was re-elected unopposed in 1886, and resigned his seat on 21 June 1889 by becoming Steward of the Manor of Northstead.

References

External links 
 

Members of the Parliament of the United Kingdom for Scottish constituencies
People educated at Eton College
Alumni of Balliol College, Oxford
Deputy Lieutenants of Fife
1851 births
1893 deaths
UK MPs 1880–1885
UK MPs 1885–1886
UK MPs 1886–1892
Scottish Liberal Party MPs
Younger sons of earls
Members of the Parliament of the United Kingdom for Fife constituencies
19th-century Scottish politicians
Robert